The Cosmic Scene is a 1958 album by American pianist, composer and bandleader Duke Ellington. Featuring a nonet rather than his usual big band, the album was credited as "Duke Ellington's Spacemen" and was recorded and released on the Columbia label. It was reissued by Mosaic Records in 2007.

Reception
The Allmusic reviewer Michael G. Nastos stated:
Perhaps in many ways a neglected recording in the vast annals of Ellingtonia, fans will certainly welcome this long out of print re-addition to the master's CD discography. It comes highly recommended.

Track listing
:All compositions by Duke Ellington except as indicated

Recorded at Columbia 30th Street Studio, New York on April 2 (tracks 1, 2 & 9-11) and April 3 (tracks 3-8 & 12), 1958

Bonus tracks on CD reissue

Personnel
Duke Ellington – piano
Clark Terry - trumpet
Quentin Jackson, Britt Woodman - trombone
John Sanders - valve trombone
Jimmy Hamilton - clarinet
Paul Gonsalves - tenor saxophone
Jimmy Woode - bass
Sam Woodyard - drums

References

Columbia Records albums
Duke Ellington albums
1958 albums
Albums recorded at CBS 30th Street Studio